SS Roanoke (1882–1916) was a passenger and cargo ship built by John Roach & Sons in Chester, Pennsylvania. The Roanoke was built for the Old Dominion Steamship Company's service from New York to Norfolk Virginia. In 1898 the ship was sold to the North American Transportation and Trading Company to take miners, supplies and gold between Seattle and ports in Alaska. Later the Roanoke was sold to the Oregon-based North Pacific Steamship Company. In 1907, the Roanoke helped to rescue the survivors of her former running mate Columbia. On May 9, 1916, the Roanoke sank in heavy seas off the California coast near San Luis Obispo with the loss of 47 lives. There were only three survivors.

Construction
The Roanoke was built at the Delaware River Iron Ship Building and Engine Works of John Roach & Sons in Chester, Pennsylvania. The ship was delivered to the Old Dominion Steamship Company in March 1882, and given the name previously held by a side-wheel paddle steamer in service with the New York and Virginia Steamship Company. The earlier Roanoke had been built around 1851, and served as a troop carrier for the Union Army in the Civil War. It then ran on a commercial route from New York to Havana and New Orleans, but was captured by Confederate privateers and destroyed. The Old Dominion took over the New York and Virginia line in 1862, and resurrected the name Roanoke for one of its new iron steamers.

Old Dominion service (1882–98)

By 1887, the Roanoke was operating on the route from New York City to Norfolk, Virginia, and among its passengers were often European Mormon immigrants making their way to Salt Lake City, Utah. The immigrants landed in New York and were processed by New York State officials at Castle Garden Immigration Depot in Lower Manhattan. Until 1887, Mormon immigrants had traveled onwards by rail using tickets arranged by Mormon agents in New York. This changed following attempts by the Grand Trunk Line Immigration Clearing House Commission to monopolize rail travel by the immigrants and raise the fares. At the same time one of the New York Board of Commissioners of Emigration attempted to block Mormon immigration entirely. Faced with these challenges, Mormon leaders negotiated a new route for the immigrants to take. After processing at Castle Garden, immigrants took the overnight trip on one of the Old Dominion's steamers to Norfolk, from where they picked up the Norfolk and Western Railroad service. This voyage remained a primary route for Mormon emigrants until the federal government took over immigration in the state of New York on April 19, 1890. During this period, more than 5,000 Mormon emigrants in forty companies traveled on the Old Dominion line.

A newspaper report from June 21, 1889 noted that 345 of 731 passengers arriving at Castle Garden were Mormons and "they were carefully culled out from the other passengers and transferred to the Old Dominion steamship Roanoke." Mormon passengers reported that the crew of the Roanoke treated them well.

In 1898, the Roanoke was sold to the Chicago-based North American Transportation and Trading Company.

Alaska service (1898–1904)

Following the discovery of gold in Klondike, Yukon during 1896, the Klondike Gold Rush brought a flood of trade during 1897 to the Pacific Northwest. This boom encouraged shipping companies to bring steamers to the region for the 1898 season. The Roanoke, bound from Baltimore, was one of 17 steamers listed in the February 28, 1898 edition of the Seattle Post-Intelligencer as heading for Seattle to transport miners and their supplies to the gold fields.

There were two primary routes from Seattle to the Yukon gold fields. One was by ship to the south-east Alaskan towns of Dyea and Skagway, and then via land for 30 miles over high mountain passes from where the miners could travel down the tributaries of the Yukon River. The other route was longer and more costly but faster and less grueling: Miners would take a coastal steamer to the Yukon delta port of St. Michael, from where they could transfer to a river steamer to head up the Yukon River. The Roanoke was brought to Seattle specifically by the North American Transportation and Trading Company to serve the long coastal route to St. Michael, sometime calling at intermediate ports such as Dutch Harbor. The NATTC began advertising the Roanokes service in March 1898.

The lead story in the July 20, 1898 edition of the Post-Intelligencer was the docking of the Roanoke in Seattle with four tons of gold from Alaska aboard. After the discovery of gold at Nome, Alaska in September 1898 precipitated the Nome Gold Rush, the Roanoke'''s route was modified to end at Nome. The Roanoke remained serving the Alaska route until at least June 1904. In August 1904, the Roanoke was reported to be laid up for repairs.

Oregon and California coast (1905–16)

By 1905, the Roanoke was serving ports in California and Oregon. On November 27, 1905, the ship lost its rudder and stern post while crossing the harbor bar at Eureka, California in heavy seas during an ebb tide.

By 1906, the Roanoke was owned by the North Pacific Steamship Company, which also owned the George W. Elder another nightboat built for the Old Dominion Steamship Company. For the next decade, the George W. Elder and Roanoke worked the NPSC's primary route from Portland, via Eureka and San Francisco to Los Angeles.

On July 21, 1907, the Roanoke and the George W. Elder were involved in the rescue of survivors from the Columbia, another ship from the Delaware River yard. The Columbia had collided with the lumber schooner San Pedro off Shelter Cove, California, causing the Columbia to sink, killing 88 people. Both the George W. Elder and Roanoke arrived at the site of the disaster and picked up Columbias survivors from the badly damaged San Pedro.

Sinking
By 1916, the Roanoke was under charter for service to South America. The Roanoke'' left San Francisco bound for Valparaíso, Chile at midnight May 8/9, 1916 with a cargo of explosives, wheat, oil and gasoline. The ship foundered in heavy seas in the Pacific Ocean off Point Buchon, California at about 3 p.m. on May 9. 47 people died and three crew members were rescued from a lifeboat that beached near San Luis Obispo, California.

References

Sources

Books, web resources and journals

Newspapers
 
 
 
 
 
 
 
 
 
 

Steamships of the United States
Maritime incidents in 1905
Maritime incidents in 1916
1882 ships
Passenger ships of the United States
Ships built by the Delaware River Iron Ship Building and Engine Works